The Grande Rousse (3,607m) is a mountain of the Graian Alps in Aosta Valley, Italy. It is the culminating point of a ridge separating the Rhêmes and the Valgrisenche valleys. It was first climbed in 1864.

References

Mountains of the Alps
Alpine three-thousanders
Mountains of Aosta Valley